Lizano is a Spanish surname. Notable people with the surname include:

César Lizano (born 1982), Costa Rican long-distance runner
Inocente Lizano (born 1940), Cuban cyclist
Saturnino Lizano Gutiérrez (1826–1905), President of Costa Rica
Susana Lizano (born 1957), Mexican astrophysicist

Other uses 

 Lizano sauce, a Costa Rican condiment originally developed by the Lizano company

Spanish-language surnames